W.H. Machin was a footballer who played for Burslem Port Vale in the early 1900s.

Career
Machin joined Burslem Port Vale in September 1900, making his debut at the Athletic Ground in a goalless draw with Grimsby Town on 3 November. He made three further Second Division appearances in the 1900–01 season. He played two games in the 1901–02 campaign, and featured once in both the 1902–03 and 1903–04 seasons. He was released at the end of the 1904–05 season.

Career statistics
Source:

References

Year of birth missing
Year of death missing
English footballers
Association football defenders
Port Vale F.C. players
English Football League players